Propynyllithium is an organolithium compound with the chemical formula . It is a white solid that is soluble in 1,2-dimethoxyethane, and tetrahydrofuran.   To preclude its degradation by oxygen and water, propynyllithium and its solutions are handled under inert gas (argon or nitrogen).  Although commonly depicted as a monomer, 
propynyllithium adopts a more complicated cluster structure as seen for many other organolithium compounds.

Synthesis
Various preparations of propynyllithium are known, but the most expeditious route starts with 1-bromopropene:
CH3CH=CHBr   +   2 BuLi   →   CH3C≡CLi  +  2 BuH  +  LiBr

Historic routes
It can be prepared by passing propyne gas through a solution of n-butyllithium or by direct metallization of propyne with lithium in liquid ammonia or other solvent. Propyne, however, is an expensive gas, and, therefore, it is sometimes replaced by less expensive gas mixtures used for welding and containing a small percentage of propyne.

Applications
Propynyllithium is used in the organic synthesis as a reactant. It is a nucleophile that adds to aldehydes to give secondary alcohols, with ketones to give tertiary alcohols, and with acid chlorides to give ketones containing the propynyl group. These reactions are used in the synthesis of complex natural and synthetic substances such as the drug mifepristone.

References

External links
Safety Data Sheet

Alkyne derivatives
Organolithium compounds